Nuggehalli Pankaja (born 2 June 1929) is an Indian writer and poet in the Kannada and English languages. She is considered one of the notable writers in the Kannada language. Her works include novels, short stories, and plays. She was conferred the Excellence in World Poetry Award by the International Academy for English Poetry. Some of her novels have been made into movies in Kannada.

Novels made into films
(This list is incomplete, please help expanding it)

Bibliography

Novels
 Kaveriya Arthrava
 Barale Innu Yamune?
 Ushanishi
 Malayamaruta
 Veena oh Veena!
 Mugilaminchu
 Gagana
 Namaskara Garudammanavare En Samachara?
 Balli-Moggu
 Deepa
 Goodu Bitta Hakki
 Teli Banda Bandhana
 Sandya Baruvale?
 Pratikarada Suliyalli
 Tere Sariyutu
 Alege Sikkida Yele
 Tuvvi Tuvvi, Uliyitu Gubbacchi
 Konegondu Kathe, Mulegondu Maathu
 Eradu Rembegalu
 Ondu Vasanta Rutuvinalli
 Mohinigondu Haadu
 Anuragada Seletha
 Balina Uyyale

Short stories
 Ardha Chandra
 Ippattu Varshagala Hinde
 Mother Tree
 Educating The Maid Servant

Plays
 Salome
 Aa Ondu Vishada Ghalige
 Aralikatte Ramachariya Eradaneya Hendati

Awards 

 Karnataka Sahitya Academy award in recognition to her contribution to Kannada Literature
 Anupama Prashsti given yearly to recognized writers byLekakiyara sangha (Lady writers association).
 Community Award
 Golden Jubilee Award of Independence
 Atimabbe Award
 Shrirasa Award
 Nuggehalli Award
 Chandrakala Prashasti
 Koravanji-Aparanji Award given in recognition of Humorous works,
 Suwarna Karnataka Shri Prashasti
 Recognition of novel ‘Balli-Moggu’ by Kannada Sahitya Parishat
 All India Radio Award for the story of the drama ‘Namaskara Garudammanavare….En Samachara?’ broadcast through all stations.
 Excellence in World Poetry Award conferred by International Academy for English Poetry.

References

External links
 Nuggehalli Pankaja profile

1929 births
English-language writers from India
Kannada-language writers
Living people
Women writers from Karnataka
Poets from Karnataka
20th-century Indian short story writers
20th-century Indian dramatists and playwrights
20th-century Indian poets
20th-century Indian novelists
Indian women poets
Indian women novelists
Indian women dramatists and playwrights
Indian women short story writers
Writers from Bangalore
Women of the Kingdom of Mysore
People of the Kingdom of Mysore
Novelists from Karnataka
20th-century Indian women writers
Dramatists and playwrights from Karnataka